Dr. J. Buzz Von Ornsteiner (born August 20, 1967) aka Dr. Buzz is a licensed forensic psychologist who provides weekly commentary for the TV show CopyCat Killers which airs on Reelz channel.

Career
Von Ornsteiner is a licensed psychologist and has a history working with the mentally ill within the context of the legal system.
From 2012 till 2019 he was the project director for the Mental Health Court Advocacy Program which was based in Brooklyn Arraignment Court. The program, which ended when the city's new bail reform law came into effect was created to divert from further adjudication and confinement, seriously and persistently mentally ill offenders charged with minor, low-level non-violent crimes at the first point of contact within Criminal Court, at Brooklyn Arraignment Court. In addition, Von Ornsteiner also was the project director for EAC NETWORK's Forensic Intensive Case Management Program which provided intensive case management services for severely mentally ill males recently released from New York State prisons. Transitional services included placement within the New York City homeless shelter system. In 2021, Von Ornsteiner began working within the Health and Wellness section of the NYPD

Before receiving his doctoral degree, Von Ornsteiner also appeared as a lead actor in several feature films during the late 1980s: Robot Holocaust, Slash Dance and Zombie Death House.

Von Ornsteiner became known to the public as "Dr. Buzz", appearing first on New York City radio station WWRL with his own show "Ask Dr. Buzz" and then on national cable stations, CNN International, CNN Headline News, Fox News, E Entertainment, MSNBC, WNYW, Court TV News, Tru TV, WPIX, Investigation Discovery and Reelz as a regular expert analyst commenting on current high-profile criminal cases.

Selected Television credits

Selected Radio appearances

References

External links
 

Actors from Reno, Nevada
City College of New York alumni
Indiana State University alumni
Hunter College alumni
New York University alumni
American male actors
21st-century American psychologists
American radio personalities
Living people
1967 births
20th-century American psychologists